The Last of Us is a 2016 Tunisian drama film directed by Ala Eddine Slim. It was selected as the Tunisian entry for the Best Foreign Language Film at the 90th Academy Awards, but it was not nominated.

Plot
N. travels through the desert of Sub-Saharan Africa and by boat to Europe. Lost in a mysterious forest, he meets a silent old man. They get in the back of a smuggler's truck, and soon after they're attacked by men with guns. One of them escapes to sea. He soon finds himself in an endless forest, where a kind of spiritual journey unfolds.

Cast
 Fethi Akkari as M
 Jahwar Soudani as N

Awards 
 Luigi De Laurentiis Award for First Feature and Prize for the Best Technical Contribution, Venice Film Festival 2016
 Critics' Week (WP)
 Tanit d'Or for First Film and Best Cinematography (Amine Messadi)
 Carthage Film Festival 2016

See also
 List of submissions to the 90th Academy Awards for Best Foreign Language Film
 List of Tunisian submissions for the Academy Award for Best Foreign Language Film

References

External links
 

2016 films
2016 drama films
Tunisian drama films